Hots News is a 1936 British comedy film directed by W. P. Kellino and starring Lupino Lane, Phyllis Clare and Wallace Lupino.

It was made as a quota quickie at Cricklewood Studios.

Synopsis
An idiot working as a guest reporter on a newspaper gets entangled with Chicago gangsters.

Cast
 Lupino Lane as Jimmy Selby 
 Phyllis Clare as Betty Mason 
 Wallace Lupino as Horace Wells 
 Barbara Kilner as Princess Ina 
 Ben Welden as Slug Wilson 
 Glen Raynham as Barbara O'Neill 
 Reginald Long as Prince Stephen 
 Fred Leslie as Leslie Fredericks 
 George Pughe as Slim McGill

References

Bibliography
 Chibnall, Steve. Quota Quickies: The British of the British 'B' Film. British Film Institute, 2007.
 Low, Rachael. Filmmaking in 1930s Britain. George Allen & Unwin, 1985.
 Wood, Linda. British Films, 1927-1939. British Film Institute, 1986.

External links

1936 films
British comedy films
British black-and-white films
1936 comedy films
1930s English-language films
Films directed by W. P. Kellino
Films shot at Cricklewood Studios
Quota quickies
1930s British films